J. Edwin Lloyd, Sr. is the Director-General of the Bureau of Veterans Affairs, Republic of Liberia.  The first official to head this newly created department of the Liberian government, Dr. Lloyd is a veteran of the Armed Forces of Liberia with international acclaim as one of Liberia’s foremost humanitarian leaders and clergymen.

Lloyd is a 20-year veteran of the Armed Forces of Liberia (AFL) with advanced training in the United States and North Africa. As a top brass of the AFL, he served as Quarter Master General of the AFL (1975–1979), and Chaplain General of the AFL (1979–1980).

Subsequent to his military career, Lloyd gained much prominence amongst religious and humanitarian leaders of Liberia. He served as Special Representative of the International Red Cross to the famine stricken regions of Ethiopia and Sudan (1985–1986) after which he was elected as President of the Liberian National Red Cross Society  (LNRCS) (1986–1990). Lloyd’s tenure as President of the Liberian National Red Cross was marked by many notable achievements including the expansion of chapters throughout Liberia, the recruitment of youth into the Red Cross, establishment of Monrovia’s only Blood Bank, and the acquisition of ambulances.

As the leading figure of the Red Cross Societies in Africa, he received several international awards including the Society’s highest – the Henry Dunant Medal for distinguished services to humanity.Lloyd is  noted for his leadership and pioneering roles in several other humanitarian organizations. He is also a former executive of the Family Planning Association of Liberia (FPAL), as well as a founder and former Treasurer of the “Group of 77” which caters to the handicapped.

Lloyd received his undergraduate education in Theology at the Liberian Baptist Theological Seminary, and holds a Master of Divinity and Doctor of Philosophy in Religious Studies from the Breakthrough Bible College of the Oral Roberts University. He was ordained as a Baptist minister in 1976, and rose steadily within the ranks of the Liberian clergy gaining the attention of President William R. Tolbert, Jr. who appointed him as the chief military cleric in 1979. With this portfolio, he became a pioneering figure in the establishment of the Liberian Council of Churches.

In 1990 he founded the HUB Ministries, International which is credited for establishing the Union Baptist Center - the first multifaceted refugee center in the Ivory Coast offering relief services to thousands of Liberian refugees during the dark days of the Liberian Civil War.  As President and Executive Director of HUB (1990–2007), Lloyd established offices across the Ivory Coast and the United States and sought relief for more than  200, 000 Liberian refugees.

Lloyd has traveled to 36 countries and received more than 40 awards for his services to the church and humanity. He  remains a leading voice within the Liberian clergy, and a leading cleric within the Liberian Baptist arena where he formerly served as the Chairman of the Providence Baptist Association (PBC), and President of  Liberian Baptist Sunday School Convention. He is currently the Chairman of the Board of Directors of HUB Ministries, Int’l and Senior Pastor of the Hopeful Baptist Church in Schiefflin, Liberia where he has presided since 1978.

References

http://www.theperspective.org/alja.htm
http://www.liberianredcross.org

Liberian politicians
Living people
Liberian Protestant clergy
Liberian military personnel
Oral Roberts University alumni
Year of birth missing (living people)